Duck Mountain Ski Area is a ski area located in Saskatchewan's Duck Mountain Provincial Park approximately 2.5 kilometres from the Manitoba-Saskatchewan border. It is 36 km from Kamsack and 116 km from Yorkton. The Duck Mountains, the area where the hill is located, are a feature of the Manitoba Escarpment. Thunderhill Ski Area, 50 km to the north is another ski hill located along the Manitoba Escarpment. The operating season for Duck Mountain Ski Area varies depending on weather and snow conditions, but the hill typically is open from late December to mid-March every year.

History
Duck Mountain Ski Area was established in 1978. The ski hill is managed by a not-for-profit organization, with members from:
 Town of Kamsack
 RM of Cote #271
 Kamsack Ski Club
 Duck Mountain Provincial Park
 and members at large

See also
 List of ski areas and resorts in Canada

References

Ski areas and resorts in Saskatchewan